Daniel Moreno Fernández (born 5 September 1981) is a Spanish former professional road racing cyclist, who rode professionally between 2005 and 2018 for the , , ,  and  teams. He specialised in mountain and high-mountain races along with Grand Tours like the Giro d'Italia and Vuelta a España, winning three stages of the latter in 2011 and 2013.

Career

Amateur career
In 2003, Moreno was a member of the Alcosto–Fuenlabrada team, and he won the Volta a Portugal do Futuro. At his very first race, the annual Tour of Britain, he achieved a prominent result by finishing 5th in the general classification.

Relax–Fuenlabrada (2005–07)
He advanced further by ranking 2nd at the Clásica de Ordizia and the Vuelta a Andalucía.

In 2006, he achieved his first victories by taking stage wins at the Clásica Internacional de Alcobendas and the Volta ao Alentejo. He supplemented his triumphs with three podiums at the Volta ao Alentejo, the Clásica Internacional de Alcobendas and the Vuelta a Burgos.

In 2007 it also turned out to be successful year for Moreno. He won stages at the Tour de San Luis, Vuelta a Chihuahua, and the Escalada a Montjuïc. Along with that, he showed himself to good advantage by taking 2nd place in a stage of the Vuelta a España and, thus, reaching 12th position in the final general classification. In September he announced his move to French team  for the next year but then Moreno renounced his own statement.

2008–10
Moreno managed to return to the peloton only in March 2008 after signing a contract with the Spanish team .

Team Katusha (2011–15)

2011
In 2011 he joined Russian  and became a domestique for his team leader, Joaquim Rodríguez. Accompanying Rodríguez in mountain races, Moreno managed to win several significant competitions including the Giro del Piemonte and the Vuelta a Burgos. On 23 August he triumphed in stage 4 of the Vuelta a España, joining the lone escapee of Chris Anker Sørensen in the final kilometres. Sorensen had been part of an earlier break and Moreno sat on his wheel, attacking in the final  as the peloton was charging behind. The next day he successfully assisted Rodríguez at Valdepeñas de Jaén. The coordinated performance of the two Spaniards brought Moreno to 3rd place while Rodríguez topped the podium. During all three weeks of the racem Moreno rode at his best and, thus, ranked 9th in the general classification. In October, Moreno won the Italian classic Giro del Piemonte, after shaking off the leading group of thirteen after the flamme rouge on an uphill false flat.

2012
In 2012 Moreno kept on going forward. He triumphed at the GP Miguel Induráin, took first place on stage 4 of the Vuelta a Andalucía and won 2 stages of the Critérium du Dauphiné. Moreno also firmly assisted Rodríguez to second overall at the Giro d'Italia. The Vuelta a España and other home races were among his top priorities for the ongoing season.

Moreno ultimately limited his losses to 22 seconds on that stage, retaining the leader's jersey by 10 seconds over Henao. He also won 2 stages and the points classification at the race.

He also had a solid 5th-place finish in the Vuelta a España, where he helped his team leader Rodríguez in the mountain stages; Rodríguez took third overall.

2013
In 2013, Moreno won the World Tour race La Flèche Wallonne, after following an attack initiated by Philippe Gilbert on the final climb, the Mur de Huy. He passed Gilbert and Carlos Betancur to grab the victory. He later continued his good form into the Critérium du Dauphiné where he finished 3rd overall. At the Vuelta a España, he won stages 4 and 9 and finished 10th in the final general classification.

Movistar Team (2016–17)
In October 2015,  announced that they had signed Moreno on a two-year contract from 2016.

EF Education First–Drapac (2018)
In November 2017, it was announced that Moreno was to join the  team for the 2018 season.

Major results

2004
 5th Overall Tour of Britain
2005
 2nd Overall Vuelta a Andalucía
 2nd Prueba Villafranca de Ordizia
 6th Clásica a los Puertos de Guadarrama
2006
 2nd Overall Volta ao Alentejo
1st Stage 3
 3rd Overall Clásica Internacional de Alcobendas
1st Stage 1
 3rd Overall Vuelta a Burgos
 4th Prueba Villafranca de Ordizia
 4th Subida al Naranco
 7th Overall Vuelta a Asturias
2007
 1st Overall Escalada a Montjuïc
1st Stages 1a & 1b (ITT)
 1st Stage 5 Tour de San Luis
 1st Stage 4 Vuelta a Chihuahua
 2nd Overall Clásica Internacional de Alcobendas
 3rd Clásica a los Puertos de Guadarrama
 4th Overall Vuelta a Burgos
 5th Subida a Urkiola
 7th Overall Vuelta por un Chile Líder
 7th Gran Premio de Llodio
 9th Circuito de Getxo
2008
 6th Overall Vuelta a La Rioja
 9th Overall Euskal Bizikleta
1st Stage 1
 9th Overall Vuelta a Burgos
2009
 2nd Overall Tour de Pologne
 2nd Gran Piemonte
 2nd Japan Cup
 5th Overall Vuelta a Chihuahua
1st Stage 4
 6th Prueba Villafranca de Ordizia
 7th Subida al Naranco
 10th GP Miguel Induráin
2010
 8th Clásica de Almería
 10th Brabantse Pijl
2011
 1st Gran Piemonte
 2nd Overall Vuelta a Burgos
1st Stage 4
 2nd Prueba Villafranca de Ordizia
 3rd Coppa Sabatini
 8th La Flèche Wallonne
 9th Overall Vuelta a España
1st Stage 4
 9th Trofeo Deià
2012
 1st  Overall Vuelta a Burgos
1st  Points classification
1st Stages 1 & 2
 1st GP Miguel Induráin
 Critérium du Dauphiné
1st Stages 2 & 7
 1st Stage 4 Vuelta a Andalucía
 5th Overall Vuelta a España
2013
 1st La Flèche Wallonne
 3rd Overall Critérium du Dauphiné
 3rd Milano–Torino
 4th Gran Premio Industria e Commercio di Prato
 6th Giro di Lombardia
 10th Overall Vuelta a España
1st Stages 4 & 9
2014
 2nd Overall Vuelta a Burgos
1st  Points classification
 3rd Milano–Torino
 5th Gran Premio Industria e Commercio di Prato
 8th Overall Tirreno–Adriatico
 9th Amstel Gold Race
 9th La Flèche Wallonne
 9th Liège–Bastogne–Liège
 10th Overall Tour of Oman
2015
 1st Prologue (TTT) Tour of Austria
 2nd Giro di Lombardia
 3rd Overall Vuelta a Burgos
1st  Points classification
1st Stage 5
 4th Clásica de San Sebastián
 5th La Flèche Wallonne
 6th Overall Tour de San Luis
 6th GP Miguel Induráin
 9th Overall Vuelta a España
 9th Milano–Torino
 10th Liège–Bastogne–Liège
2016
 3rd  Road race, UEC European Road Championships
 3rd Overall Vuelta a Asturias
1st  Points classification
1st Stage 3
 4th Milano–Torino
 8th Overall Vuelta a España
2017
 4th Road race, National Road Championships
 7th Overall Vuelta a Burgos

Grand Tour general classification results timeline

References

External links

1981 births
Living people
Spanish male cyclists
Spanish Vuelta a España stage winners
Cyclists from Madrid